Béatrice Valentine Amrhein  (born 1961 in Wassy) is a French artist. She lives and works in Arcueil.

Biography
Amrhein was trained as a painter at l’École nationale supérieure des Beaux-Arts in Paris, at École nationale des beaux arts of Nancy and as a fashion designer at Parsons The New School for Design  in New York.

Amrhein works in painting, drawing, sculpture, photography, video, multimedia, and installation.
Her work has been exhibited at the Contemporary Museum in Baltimore, USA, in 2007;  Herzliya Museum of Contemporary Art, Tel Aviv Herzliya; Palais de Tokyo, Paris; Convent of the Cordeliers, and Châteauroux in 2004..

Amrhein has held numerous solo exhibitions around the world. Some of her notable exhibitions are Paris-Texas (1992), Innocent Désire (1993), Hope (1994), Prométhée (1995). Since 2000, she has exhibited regularly at Galerie Pascal Gabert, C. Downey, New York, Sara Gata Studio, New York, and Nancy Wine, Brooklyn, New York.

References

External links 
 Beatrice Valentine Amrhein's Web page
 Art Gallery Studio La Citta, Verona, Italy 
 Washington Post's article on Baltimore's exhibition in 2004
 Video shown in 2004 in Chateauroux
 Lee Wells / Cinema-scope / Perpetual Art Machine / Scope Art Fair, New York, 2006
 Article on Video Lustre installation

Living people
1969 births
20th-century French women artists
21st-century French women artists
Parsons School of Design alumni